The Truth Is That You Are Alive is the third full-length album by An Angle.

Track listing
"oh! oh! oh! Trouble" – 3:30   
"Clean and Gold" – 3:17  
"Falling In Your Arms" – 3:42  
"Even If I..." – 3:24  
"Going To Heaven" – 2:04  
"No More Child" – 4:17  
"Red River" – 2:21  
"I'm Alright" – 3:45  
"Ghost In The Mirror" – 4:23
"C'mon C'mon" – 4:14
"On My Way" - 5:56
"You Are Loved" - 4:25

References

2005 albums
An Angle albums
Drive-Thru Records albums